Oliver Loode (born March 19, 1974, in Tallinn) is an Estonian human rights activist of the international Finno-Ugric movement and Member of United Nations Permanent Forum on Indigenous Issues (UNPFII) for the term 2014–2016.

Career 
In 2011–2013 Oliver Loode represented Estonia in the Youth Association of Finno-Ugric Peoples (MAFUN). During that period he was one of the initiators of the Finno-Ugric Capital of Culture programme. In 2013–2015, Loode was board member of NPO Fenno-Ugria. Since 2014, Oliver Loode serves as Expert Member of United Nations Permanent Forum on Indigenous Issues (UNPFII), nominated by Estonian Ministry of Foreign Affairs. In April 2015 Loode was appointed as vice-chair of the 14th Session of UNPFII.

In 2018 Loode received a 55-year ban from entering Russia, possibly due to his activism in Crimea.

Education 
Oliver Loode graduated from the Wharton School of the University of Pennsylvania in 1997 with a Bachelor of Sciences in Economics degree (Magna Cum Laude).

External links 
 October 6, 2014 article by Loode on Finno-Ugrians
 September 28, 2015 article by Loode on NGOs and Russia

References 

Wharton School of the University of Pennsylvania alumni
Living people
1974 births
Members of the Advisory Committee of the Framework Convention for the Protection of National Minorities